Metalegoceras sundaicum is an extinct species of marine invertebrate animals belonging to the family Schistoceratidae.

Description
Shells of this cephalopod have 13 external and internal lobes and saddles.

Distribution
Shells of this species can be found in the Permian of East Timor and Indonesia.

References
 The Paleobiology Database
 F. A. H . W . De Marez Ovens On Paralegoceras sundaicum Haniel and related forms  (1933) 
 Carl Colton Branson Bibliographic Index of Permian Invertebrates

External links
 The Fossil Forum

Neoicoceratoidea